Bitangad Fort is a fort in Nashik district in the Igatpuri taluka in  Maharashtra state of India.

Location
The fort is located about 130 km from Mumbai. The nearest town is Ghoti. The fort lies about 22 km east of the Ghoti town  on Kalsubai hill range. The fort is situated near the village Taked. A short walk from the Hanuman temple at Taked leads to the base village Bitanwadi.

Places to see
This fort can be reached after an easy walk of 30mins followed by a steep rock technical climb of another half an hour from the base village Bitangad. There are no proper fortifications or bastions left on the fort except for a few rock cut caves and water cisterns.

History
Very little history of this fort is known. It was used as a watch tower.

References 

Buildings and structures of the Maratha Empire	
Forts in Nashik district
16th-century forts in India